Kurnakovite is a hydrated borate of magnesium with the chemical composition MgB3O3(OH)5·5H2O. It is a member of the inderite group and is a triclinic dimorph of the monoclinic inderite.

Discovery and occurrence
Kurnakovite, was first described by Godlevsky in 1940 for an occurrence in the Inder lake borate deposits in Atyrau Province, Kazakhstan, and is named for Russian mineralogist and chemist Nikolai Semenovich Kurnakov (1860–1941).

In addition to the type locality in Kazakhstan, kurakovite has also been reported from the Zhacang-Caka brine lake, Tibet; the Kirka borate deposit, Kiitahya Province, Turkey;  the Kramer borate deposit, Boron, Kern County, California; Death Valley National Park, Inyo County, California; and the Tincalayu borax deposit, Salar del Hombre Muerto, Salta Province, Argentina.

Properties
Kurnakovite has triclinic - pinacodial crystallography. It forms as rough, prismatic crystals, typically in dense aggregates. Kurnakovite has distinct cleavage and a conchoidal fracture. Its tenacity is brittle and it ranges between 2.5 – 3 on the Mohs hardness scale. It is not soluble in water, though it will start dissolving in warm acid. Kurnakovite is usually colorless or white and either transparent or translucent. It has a vitreous, pearly luster and a refractive index of between 1.488 - 1.525.

References

Magnesium minerals
Nesoborates
Triclinic minerals
Minerals in space group 2